Willington railway station serves Willington, Derbyshire, England.

Willington railway station may also refer to:

Willington railway station (Bedfordshire), a former station in Willington, Bedfordshire, England
Willington railway station (Durham), a former station in Willington, Durham, England

See also
Willington (disambiguation)